Karachi University cricket team, representing the University of Karachi in Karachi, played first-class cricket in Pakistan from 1958-59 to 1967-68, never losing a match.

Karachi University first played first-class cricket when the four-team Inter-Universities Championship was given first-class status in 1958-59 and 1959-60. They won in both years, beating Punjab University in the final each time.

Karachi University, along with Punjab University, then competed at first-class level in the Ayub Trophy in 1960-61, 1964–65, 1965–66, and 1967-68. They reached the semi-finals in 1960-61, when in their three matches Afaq Hussain took 29 wickets at 12.82.

Overall between 1959 and 1968 Karachi University played 13 first-class matches, winning 8 and drawing 5.

Notable cricketers
 Afzaal Ahmed
 Asif Ahmed (cricketer, born 1942)
 Naushad Ali (cricketer)
 Afaq Hussain
 Tariq Javed
 Shahid Mahmood
 Nasim-ul-Ghani
 Abdur Raqib (cricketer)
 Mahboob Shah
 Iqbal Umar

References

External links 
 First-class matches played by Karachi University at CricketArchive

Pakistani first-class cricket teams
Former senior cricket clubs of Pakistan
Cricket in Karachi